The James Ford Bell Library is a special collection of the University of Minnesota Libraries  located on the University of Minnesota Minneapolis campus. It is named for its first donor and patron James Ford Bell, founder of the General Mills Corporation in Minneapolis, Minnesota.  The collection consists of some 40,000 rare books, maps, manuscripts, broadsides, pamphlets and other materials documenting the history and impact of international trade and cultural exchange in the pre-modern era, before ca. 1800. Its materials range in date from 400 CE to 1825 CE, with the bulk of the collection concentrated between the years 1450 and 1790, the early modern period. The library is known for its globe gores copy of the 1507 Waldseemuller world map, and it acquired a copy of the 1602 Impossible Black Tulip Chinese world map in 2009.  The scope of the collection is global and more than 15 languages are represented.

The library was founded at the University of Minnesota in 1953 and was located first in Walter Library. It moved to the newly constructed Wilson Library in 1968. In March 2018, the Bell moved again to its current location in the university's Elmer L. Andersen Library building.

The Associates of the James Ford Bell Library was established in 1963 as friends group that contributes to the support of the library and sponsors events and publications. The library has a variety of publications and since 1964 has sponsored an annual public lecture series: the James Ford Bell Lecture.

Curators

 Dr. John "Jack" Parker, 1953-1991
 Dr. Carol Urness, 1991-2001 
 Dr. Brian Fryckenberg, 2003
 Dr. Marguerite Ragnow, 2005–present

References

 The James Ford Bell Library: An annotated catalog of original source materials relating to the history of European expansion, 1400-1800 Minneapolis, Minn.: James Ford Bell Library, University of Minnesota, 1994.
 James Ford Bell and his books: the nucleus of a library. Minneapolis, Minn. : Associates of the James Ford Bell Library, University of Minnesota, 1993.
 A book for Jack: words to, by and about John Parker, curator of the James Ford Bell Library, University of Minnesota, edited by Carol Urness. Minneapolis/St. Paul: Associates of the James Ford Bell Library, 1991.
 The world for a marketplace : episodes in the history of European expansion : commemorating the 25th anniversary of the James Ford Bell Library, by John Parker.  Minneapolis: Associates of the James Ford Bell Library, 1978.
 The Manifest : a newsletter to the Associates of the James Ford Bell Library, Wilson Library, University of Minnesota.
 The merchant explorer: a commentary on selected recent acquisitions.  1961-

External links
 James Ford Bell Library

1953 establishments in Minnesota
Libraries established in 1953
Libraries in Minnesota
Research libraries in the United States
Special collections libraries in the United States
University and college academic libraries in the United States
University of Minnesota